Zaida Cantera de Castro (born 6 June 1977) is a Spanish retired military officer and politician currently affiliated with the Spanish Socialist Workers' Party (PSOE). She has been a deputy for Madrid in the 11th and  Legislatures.

Military career
She also holds Master's degrees in Networks and Information Systems and Communication and Information Systems for Security and Defense.

She was assigned to the Signals Unit of the Armored Brigade and participated in international missions such as the conflicts in Kosovo and Lebanon, reaching the rank of major in the Army. After returning from the latter country she began to suffer sexual harassment from a superior, a fact that she denounced before the Central Military Court. In 2014, she requested her departure from the Armed Forces and was definitively discharged in 2015. Cantera recounted these episodes of harassment in the book No, mi general, in co-authorship with UPyD deputy Irene Lozano.

Political career
On 20 December 2015, Cantera was elected a member of the Congress of Deputies as part of the PSOE list for Madrid. In the investiture vote of Mariano Rajoy, she was one of the 15 socialist MP's not that abstained from voting against the party lines, and she joined the PSOE on 5 January 2017 in order to vote in the primaries of the 39th federal congress in favor of Pedro Sánchez.

References

External links

 

1977 births
20th-century Spanish military personnel
21st-century Spanish military personnel
21st-century Spanish women writers
Living people
Members of the 11th Congress of Deputies (Spain)
Members of the 12th Congress of Deputies (Spain)
Members of the 13th Congress of Deputies (Spain)
Military personnel from Madrid
Politicians from Madrid
Spanish army officers
Spanish Socialist Workers' Party politicians
Women members of the Congress of Deputies (Spain)
Members of the 14th Congress of Deputies (Spain)
20th-century Spanish women